The Women's shot put event  at the 2011 European Athletics Indoor Championships was held on March 4–5, 2011 with the final being held on March 5 at 14:20 local time.

Records

Results

Qualification
Qualification: Qualification Performance 17.90 (Q) or at least 8 best performers advanced to the final. It was held at 15:50.

Final
The final was held at 14:20.

References

Shot put at the European Athletics Indoor Championships
2011 European Athletics Indoor Championships
2011 in women's athletics